In proof compression LowerUnits (LU) is an algorithm used to compress propositional logic resolution proofs. The main idea of LowerUnits is to exploit the following fact:

 Theorem: Let  be a potentially redundant proof, and  be the redundant proof | redundant node. If ’s clause is a unit clause, 
 then  is redundant.

The algorithm targets exactly the class of  global redundancy stemming from multiple resolutions with unit clauses. The algorithm takes its name from the fact that, when this rewriting is done and the resulting proof is displayed as a DAG (directed acyclic graph), the unit node  appears lower (i.e., closer to the root) than it used to appear in the original proof. 

A naive implementation exploiting theorem would require the proof to be traversed and fixed after each unit node is lowered. It is possible, however, to do better by first collecting and removing all the unit nodes in a single traversal, and afterwards fixing the whole proof in a single second traversal. Finally, the collected and fixed unit nodes have to be reinserted at the bottom of the proof.

Care must be taken with cases when a unit node  occurs above in the subproof that derives another unit node . Difficulties with such dependencies can be easily avoided if we reinsert the upper unit node  after reinserting the unit node  (i.e. after reinsertion,  must appear below , to cancel the extra literal  from ’s clause). This can be ensured by collecting the unit nodes in a queue during a bottom-up traversal of the proof and reinserting them in the order they were queued.

The algorithm for fixing a proof containing many roots performs a top-down traversal of the proof, recomputing the resolvents and replacing broken nodes (e.g. nodes having deletedNodeMarker as one of their parents) by their surviving parents (e.g. the other parent, in case one parent was deletedNodeMarker).

When unit nodes are collected and removed from a proof of a clause  and the proof is fixed, the clause  in the root node of the new proof is not equal to  anymore, but contains (some of) the duals of the literals of the unit clauses that have been removed from the proof. The reinsertion of unit nodes at the bottom of the proof resolves  with the clauses of (some of) the collected unit nodes, in order to obtain a proof of  again.

Algorithm 

General structure of the algorithm

   Input: A proof 
   Output: A proof  with no global redundancy with unit redundant node

   (unitsQueue) ← collectUnits(); 
    ← fix(); 
   fixedUnitsQueue ← fix(unitsQueue); 
    ← reinsertUnits(fixedUnitsQueue);
   return ;

We collect the unit clauses as follow

   Input: A proof 

  ← ; 
 traverse  bottom-up and foreach node  in  do
   if  is unit and  has more than one child then
       add  to unitsQueue; 
   end
 end
 return (unitsQueue); 

Then we reinsert the units

   Input: A proof  (with a single root) and a queue  of root nodes 
   Output: A proof 

  ← ; 
 while  do
     if  is resolvable with root of  then
     end 
 end
 return ;

Notes 

Automated theorem proving
Proof theory